The polyiodides are a class of polyhalogen anions composed entirely of iodine atoms. The most common and simplest member is the triiodide ion, . Other known larger polyiodides include [I4]2−, [I5]−, [I6]2−, [I7]−, [I8]2−, [I9]−, [I10]2−, [I10]4−, [I11]3−, [I12]2−, [I13]3−, [I14]4-, [I16]2−, [I22]4−, [I26]3−, [I26]4−, [I28]4− and [I29]3−. All these can be considered as formed from the interaction of the I–, I2, and  building blocks.

Preparation

For example, KI3·H2O can be crystallized from a saturated solution of KI when a stoichiometric amount of I2 is added and cooled.

Structure
]

]
Polyiodides are characterized by their highly complex and variable structures, and can be considered as associations of I2, I−, and  units. Discrete polyiodides are usually linear, reflecting the origin of the ion. The more complex two- or three-dimensional network structures of chains and cages are formed as the ions interact with each other, with their shapes depending on their associated cations quite strongly, a phenomenon named dimensional caging. The table below lists the polyiodide salts which have been structurally characterized, along with their counter-cation.

Reactivity
Polyiodide compounds are generally sensitive to light due to their photochemistry. The triiodide ion, is a characteristic and well-studied triatomic system undergoing unimolecular photodissociation. Polyiodide has been used to improve the scalability in the synthesis of halide perovskite photovoltaic materials.

Conductivity
Solid state compounds containing linear-chain polyiodide ions exhibit enhanced conductivity than their simple iodide counterparts. The conductivity can be drastically modified by external pressure, which changes the interatomic distances between iodine moieties and the charge distribution.

See also
 Triiodide
 Polyhalogen ions
 Iodine–starch test
 Dye-sensitized solar cell
 Halogen bond
 Catenation
 Inorganic polymer

References

Anions
Iodides
Polyhalides